The Ryu–Takayanagi conjecture is a conjecture within holography that posits a quantitative relationship between the entanglement entropy of a conformal field theory and the geometry of an associated anti-de Sitter spacetime. The formula characterizes "holographic screens" in the bulk; that is, it specifies which regions of the bulk geometry are "responsible to particular information in the dual CFT". As a result, the authors were awarded the 2015 New Horizons in Physics Prize for "fundamental ideas about entropy in quantum field theory and quantum gravity". The formula was generalized to a covariant form in 2007.

Motivation

The thermodynamics of black holes suggests certain relationships between the entropy of black holes and their geometry. Specifically, the Bekenstein–Hawking area formula conjectures that the entropy of a black hole is proportional to its surface area:

The Bekenstein–Hawking entropy  is a measure of the information lost to external observers due to the presence of the horizon. The horizon of the black hole acts as a "screen" distinguishing one region of the spacetime (in this case the exterior of the black hole) that is not affected by another region (in this case the interior). The Bekenstein–Hawking area law states that the area of this surface is proportional to the entropy of the information lost behind it.

The Bekenstein–Hawking entropy is a statement about the gravitational entropy of a system; however, there is another type of entropy that is important in quantum information theory, namely the entanglement (or von Neumann) entropy. This form of entropy provides a measure of how far from a pure state a given quantum state is, or, equivalently, how entangled it is. The entanglement entropy is a useful concept in many areas, such as in condensed matter physics and quantum many-body systems. Given its use, and its suggestive similarity to the Bekenstein–Hawking entropy, it is desirable to have a holographic description of entanglement entropy in terms of gravity.

Holographic preliminaries

The holographic principle states that gravitational theories in a given dimension are dual to a gauge theory in one lower dimension. The AdS/CFT correspondence is one example of such duality. Here, the field theory is defined on a fixed background and is equivalent to a quantum gravitational theory whose different states each correspond to a possible spacetime geometry. The conformal field theory is often viewed as living on the boundary of the higher dimensional space whose gravitational theory it defines. The result of such a duality is a dictionary between the two equivalent descriptions. For example, in a CFT defined on  dimensional Minkowski space the vacuum state corresponds to pure AdS space, whereas the thermal state corresponds to a planar black hole. Important for the present discussion is that the thermal state of a CFT defined on the  dimensional sphere corresponds to the  dimensional Schwarzschild black hole in AdS space.

The Bekenstein–Hawking area law, while claiming that the area of the black hole horizon is proportional to the black hole's entropy, fails to provide a sufficient microscopic description of how this entropy arises. The holographic principle provides such a description by relating the black hole system to a quantum system which does admit such a microscopic description. In this case, the CFT has discrete eigenstates and the thermal state is the canonical ensemble of these states. The entropy of this ensemble can be calculated through normal means, and yields the same result as predicted by the area law. This turns out to be a special case of the Ryu–Takayanagi conjecture.

Conjecture

Consider a spatial slice  of an AdS space time on whose boundary we define the dual CFT. The Ryu–Takayanagi formula states:

This surface must satisfy three properties:

   is homologous to A. 
   extremizes the area. If there are multiple extremal surfaces,   is the one with the least area.

Because of property (3), this surface is typically called the minimal surface when the context is clear. The conjecture provides an explicit geometric interpretation of the entanglement entropy of the boundary CFT, namely as the area of a surface in the bulk.

Example
In their original paper, Ryu and Takayanagi show this result explicitly for an example in  where an expression for the entanglement entropy is already known. For an  space of radius , the dual CFT has a central charge given by

Furthermore,  has the metric

This act of imposing a maximum  is analogous to the corresponding CFT having a UV cutoff.

.

In this case, the boundary CFT lives at coordinates . Remembering the lattice cutoff, the length of the geodesic can be calculated as

If it is assumed that , then using the Ryu–Takayanagi formula to compute the entanglement entropy.

This agrees with the result calculated by usual means.

References

Conjectures
String theory